The red-headed malimbe (Malimbus rubricollis) is a species of bird in the family Ploceidae.
It is widespread across the African tropical rainforest.

References

External links
 Red-headed malimbe -  Species text in Weaver Watch

red-headed malimbe
Birds of the African tropical rainforest
red-headed malimbe
Taxonomy articles created by Polbot